Kate Courtney (born October 29, 1995) is an American cross-country mountain bike cyclist.

Early life 
Born to Maggie and Tom Courtney in October 1995, Kate Courtney grew up in Marin County, California at the base of Mount Tamalpais, which is considered to be the birthplace of mountain biking. Courtney was introduced to cycling at a young age by her father and they would ride a mountain-bike tandem up Mount Tamalpais together.   Her interest in cycling was piqued when, as a freshman, she joined her school mountain bike team at Branson High School.  While at high school, Courtney competed for the USA National Team and Whole Athlete Development Team in events around the World.  In 2012, Courtney became the first American woman to win a UCI Mountain Bike World Cup in the Junior category.

In 2013, Courtney graduated high school and left for Stanford University to study human biology.  In the same year, she also signed her first professional contract with Specialized Bicycles.

Professional cycling career 
After graduating from Stanford University in 2017, Courtney began racing full-time and in her first full season in 2017 won four U23 World Cups and the U23 World Cup overall title, and took a silver medal at the U23 world championship.  She is also a two-time US cross-country (XC) national champion, having won the title in 2017 and 2018.  Courtney participated at the 2018 UCI Mountain Bike World Championships, winning the gold medal in the women's elite cross country race. It was the first such win for an American since 2001.

In 2018, Courtney took part in the Cape Epic Stage race with her Specialized teammate Annika Langvad where the teammates won seven individual stages and took the Overall team victory.

In 2019, Courtney left Specialized for the Scott-SRAM team headed by Swiss mountain bike legend, Thomas Frischknecht . She ended the season as the UCI World Cup series winner.

Personal life 
Courtney is a huge fan of sharks and Shark Week. Her other hobbies include skiing, surfing, yoga, and photography. In 2020, she starred in a concussion education video as part of the CrashCourse virtual reality series for TeachAids.

Major results

2016
 2nd Overall UCI Under-23 XCO World Cup
1st Cairns
2nd Lenzerheide
2017
 1st  Cross-country, National Championships
 1st  Overall UCI Under-23 XCO World Cup
1st Nové Město
1st Lenzerheide
1st Mont-Sainte-Anne
1st Val di Sole
2nd Albstadt
2nd Vallnord
2018
 1st  Cross-country, UCI World Championships
 1st  Cross-country, National Championships
 1st  Overall Cape Epic (with Annika Langvad)
2019
 1st  Overall UCI XCO World Cup
1st Albstadt
1st Nové Město
1st Les Gets
2021
 Swiss Bike Cup
1st Savognin
2nd Leukerbad
 Internazionali d’Italia Series
1st Legend Cup
 2nd  Team relay, UCI World Championships
2022
 Swiss Bike Cup
1st Basel

References

External links
Official website

1995 births
Living people
American female cyclists
Sportspeople from San Francisco
UCI Mountain Bike World Champions (women)
Cross-country mountain bikers
Cyclists at the 2020 Summer Olympics
Olympic cyclists of the United States
21st-century American women